Booyal is a town and a locality in the Bundaberg Region, Queensland, Australia.

Geography 
The Burnett River forms the western boundary of the locality and the Gregory River, a tributary of the Isis River, runs through the location from south to north to the east of the Burnett River.

The Bruce Highway passes from the east to the north-west through the locality.

History 
Booyal is believed to be an Aboriginal word, indicating south direction.

Booyal Provisional School opened about May 1905. It became Booyal State School on 1 January 1909. It closed in 1933.

Booyal Central State School opened on 20 November 1916.

Education 
Booyal Central State School is a co-educational government primary school (P-6) at 31620 Bruce Highway. In 2016, it had an enrolment of 24 students with 2 teachers and 4 non-teaching staff (2 equivalent full-time).

There is no secondary school in Booyal, but the nearest are Isis District State High School in Childers and Gin Gin State High School in Gin Gin.

References

External links 

Towns in Queensland
Bundaberg Region
Localities in Queensland